Simone Bevilacqua (born 22 February 1997) is an Italian cyclist, who currently rides for UCI ProTeam . In October 2020, he was named in the startlist for the 2020 Giro d'Italia.

Major results
2015
 1st  Time trial, Junior National Road Championships
 1st G.P. dell'Arno
 2nd Road race, Junior National Road Championships
 2nd Gran Premio Sportivi di Sovilla
2017
 8th Popolarissima
2019
 1st Stage 7 Tour de Langkawi

Grand Tour general classification results timeline

References

External links

1997 births
Living people
Italian male cyclists
People from Thiene
Cyclists from the Province of Vicenza